The Shaolin Warriors (Chinese: 少林僧兵) is a Chinese television series directed by Raymond Lee, starring Sammo Hung, Cui Lin, Christopher Lee, Jeanette Aw, Sammy Hung, Cui Peng, Liu Ying and Li Man. The series was first broadcast in November 2008 on CCTV-8 in mainland China. It is the first wuxia television series to filmed in direct collaboration with Shaolin Monastery and features some rarely seen martial arts techniques.

Plot
The story is set in the Ming dynasty during the reign of the Jiajing Emperor. General Qi Jiguang enlists the help of Shaolin Monastery's warrior monks to defend China from the wokou (Japanese pirates) and other invaders.

Cast

 Sammo Hung as Big Feet Monk
 Cui Lin as Yuewen
 Christopher Lee as Qi Jiguang
 Hong Zhibin as Qi Jiguang (young)
 Jeanette Aw as Haiqing
 Li Man as Hideko (Xiuzi)
 Sammy Hung as Yuekong
 Cui Peng as Kazego (Fengyu)
 Liu Ying as Li Ruolan
 Luo Jiaxu as young Li Ruolan
 Chen Zhihui as Yu Dayou
 Qin Yan as Xiaoshan abbot
 Wang Jianxin as Wang Zhi
 Shen Baoping as Hu Zongxian
 Cai Gang as Yan Shifan
 Xu Seng as Jin Ke
 Fang Zhoubo as Wan Biao
 Ren Xihong as Sasaki (Zuozuomu)
 Guo Changhui as Miyamoto (Gongben)
 Liu Weihua as Li Zhongcheng
 Dai Hekang as Mao Haifeng
 Hai Yan as Xiao Lin'an
 Zhou Yunshen as Sun Haixiao
 Ding Xiaohu as Liu Qianhu
 He Xianwei as Wu Jingui
 Cao Shuai as Wang San
 Liu Kai as Yuejian
 Xue Jiangtao as Yueman
 Shi Ziliang as Yiben Daming
 Zhou Jie as Zhou Zhiyuan
 Hao Han as Xiao Fu
 Sun Lufei as Xiao Fu's mother
 Meng Yansen as Xiao Shun
 Fan Libo as Xiao Shun's mother
 Zhao Gang as Qi Jingtong
 Shu Shouqin as Wang Zhifu
 Zheng Rugao as Wangshi Zuzhang
 Li Junliang as Qiangmazi
 Gao Jiafu as Tian Zhong
 Tao Jinlong as Fengchen Xiuji
 Lu Jidong as Zhitian Cilang
 Yuan Shichao as Li Qiangzong
 Li Ke as Zheng Zhifu

Production
The series had a costly budget. In addition to the participation of Hong Kong television series director Raymond Lee as the overall director, 120 warriors monks and 200 secular students from Shaolin Monastery were involved in the production as well.

The project was completed in late 2007 after more than three months of shooting in Wuxi's Film and TV Studios.

Shaolin Monastery's abbot, Shi Yongxin, expressed his desire to spread Shaolin history and culture to the rest of the world through this television series.

United States release
The series premiered in the United States with English subtitles on Toku from 12 July 2017 to 21 February 2018.

International Broadcast

References

External links
  The Shaolin Warriors on Sina.com

2008 Chinese television series debuts
Television series set in the Ming dynasty
Chinese wuxia television series
China Central Television original programming
Television series about Shaolin Temple